The Girl or the Vase, also known as The Presentation of the Slave, is an 1878 painting by the Polish artist Henryk Siemiradzki. The subject is from ancient Rome and shows a patrician who contemplates on whether he should buy an East Asian vase or a slave girl. The painting earned Siemiradzki the gold medal at the 1878 World's Fair in Paris and the French Legion of Honour.

The painting last changed owner in 2005, when it was sold through Sotheby's in New York for 1,426,000 dollars.

References

External links
 

1878 paintings
Ancient Rome in art and culture
Paintings by Henryk Siemiradzki
Slavery in art